Ecstasy is a clothing, fashion, and lifestyle brand based in Bangladesh. The flagship store is located in Banani, Dhaka. The company was founded by Tanjim Haque who is also the CEO.

History
Ecstasy was established in 1997. It is a multi-store franchise and is one of the largest clothing brands in Bangladesh. The store describes its items as contemporary global fashion inspired.

Stores
Total number of outlets is 19. Those are-

 Basundhara City (2 outlets, 1 lifestyle store)
 Banani (lifestyle store)
 Dhanmondi (lifestyle store)
 Mohammadpur (lifestyle store)
 Uttara (1 outlet, 2 lifestyle stores)
 Jamuna Future Park (1 outlet, 2 lifestyle stores)
 Wari
 Chittagong 
 Khulna
 Sylhet 
 Comilla
 Feni
 Mymensingh

References

1997 establishments in Bangladesh
Clothing brands of Bangladesh
Organisations based in Dhaka